The Kaicene Star , originally Chana Star or more commonly known as the Changan Star is a series of kei truck and microvan built and sold by Changan Automobile under the Chana brand since 1999. The Changan Star series was later repositioned under the Kaicene brand of Changan Automobile.

The Star started off as rebadged tenth generation Suzuki Carry trucks and Suzuki Every vans, with multiple bodystyles spawned by Changan Automobile available. The model was later extended into a product series with several models.

First generation (1999–2014)

The Chana Star was launched in 1999 based on the Suzuki Every Plus and Ford Pronto vans. A few variants were available, including a single cab pickup, double cab pickup, standard van, and an extended version van featuring hinged doors instead of sliding doors.

The successor, Chan Star 2, was launched in 2007. However, the Chana Star 2 has not replaced the Chana Star, which, after a subtle facelift restyling, remains to be on the market and positioned right below the Chana Star 2 as of early 2014 with a starting price lowered to around 25,000 Yuan.

Chana Star 2 (2007–2012)

The Chana Star 2 is the second generation of the Chana Star microvan. The Star 2 was built by the Hebei subsidiary of Changan Automobile. Deliveries of the second generation microvans started on March 19, 2007, with a list price of 38,800 Yuan.

The Chana Star 2 features a longer wheelbase than the Chana Star and also features a more powerful 1.0 liter engine. Power windows and electric sliding doors, front fog lamps, remote key and alloy wheels are all available on higher trim levels. Prices of the Chana Star 2 ranges from 31,900 yuan to 46,800 yuan in China.

In the year 2013, a total of 24,800 units of the Chana Star 2 were sold in China.

Chana Star 5 (2012–present)

In July 2012, news of the succeeding Chana Star was leaked and a prototype named the Changan M201 which would replace the Chana Star 2 microvan. By August 2012, it was confirmed that the third-generation of the Chana Star microvan would be called the Xin Chana Star in China.

The Chana Star 5 was sold in China as the Xin Chana Star (新长安之星) . Prices of the Chana Star 5 ranges from 25,000 yuan to 50,900 yuan in China.

Safety

Chana Star 3 (2015–present)

The Star 3 was produced by Changan Automobile at its factory in Hebei. Launched in 2015, the Star 3 is the direct successor of the original Chana Star. The Star 3 is powered by a 1.0L or 1.2L petrol engine. The third generation Chana Star offers up to 7 seating positions. Prices of the Chana Star 3 ranges from 29,900 yuan to 39,900 yuan in China.

References

External links
Changan Star 5 Official website

2000s cars
All-wheel-drive vehicles
Kei cars
Kei trucks
Rear-wheel-drive vehicles
Microvans
Cars of China
Cars introduced in 1999